Log Kia Kahengay is a 2019 Pakistani television soap opera which aired on Hum TV. It is produced by Momina Duraid under MD Productions, directed by Adeel Qamar Khan and written by Rizwana Princes. It has debutants Komal Meer, Ameer Kamal Gillani and Sabeena Farooq in leads.

Plot 
It explores the tale of two girls Shiza (Komal Meer) and Mishal (Sabeena Farooq) who are childhood friends and shares a sisterly bond. As a result of their love for each other, Mishal asks her parents to arrange their marriage in the same family so they can live in the same house. They later become sister in laws as Shiza marries Harris, Mishal's older brother who he and Shiza have been in love since childhood. Mishal feels betrayed as they kept their relationship a secret but she soon accepts it. She later meets a handsome young man, Arsal who initially takes a liking to Shiza but doesn't act upon it because of the girls’ sisterly bond and his marriage has been fixed with Mishal, thus he marries Mishal happily and cares for her.

However things become more complicated for Shiza when her husband dies in a car accident and she was forced to marry Mishal's husband and lived her life as co-wife. What will be the fate of these three?

Cast
Komal Meer as Shiza Javed, Mishal's best friend and Arsal's second wife 
Sabeena Farooq as  Mishal Feroze, Shiza's best friend and Arsal's first wife
Ameer Kamal Gillani as Arsal, Mishal and Shiza's husband 
Shamil Khan as Feroze, Mishal  and Harris’ father
Iram Rehman as Asma Feroze, Mishal and Harris’ mother
Hassan Sheharyar Rahim as Rehan
Sadia Hayat as Najma, Arsal's mother
Zaib Khan as Azar, family friend of Shiza who likes her 
Khawaja Sajjad Paul as Harris Feroze, Mishal's older brother and Shiza's ex-husband (Dead)
Cameron Cruz
Eram Nisar Bajwa
Haleema BiBi
Lubna Shehzadi
Natasha Hussain

See also 
 List of programs broadcast by Hum TV

References

External links 
 Hum TV official website

Pakistani drama television series
2019 Pakistani television series debuts
2019 Pakistani television series endings
Urdu-language television shows
Hum TV original programming